Aisha Aliyu known by the stage name Aisha Aliyu Tsamiya is a Kannywood actress and producer who came into limelight in the film salma.

Career 
The actress featured in Zeenat as the lead cast where acted as the daughter of a rich father.

According to her interview with blueprint newspaper, the Kannywood actress ventured into business and modelling during the COVID break .She was into affiliate marketing whereby fans used her influence to sell products. Aisha later established her beauty shop in Kano on Gwarzo Road.

Filmography 

 So
 Tsamiya
 Dakin Amarya
 Hanyar Kano
 Ranar Baiko
 Salma
 Zeenat
 Uzuri
 Husna
 Ina Kika je

Personal life 
The Kannywood actress married  Alhaji Buba Abubakar on 25 February 2022 after controversy on the wedding date came up. A different date was put in the invitation date just to distract her fans while the wedding held at the stated date.

Nomination and award 
Aisha Tsamiya won the Best Actress  at the city people awards in 2014.

Footnotes 

1992 births
21st-century Nigerian actresses
Actresses from Kano State
Actresses in Hausa cinema
Living people